Lacs des Loups Marins is a lake in the north of the province of Quebec in Canada. It is located about 150 km east of Hudson Bay and about 20 km northeast of Lac à l'Eau Claire.

The name comes from its population of harbour seals (fr: loups marins or phoques). They belong to Phoca vitulina mellonae, the only seal subtype in Canada that lives year-round in fresh water.

History
The lake was known as Lower Seal Lake then Seal Lake until 1967 when it was named Lacs des Loups Marins. It was named after the Ungava seals that live on the shores and in the lake. The Cree called the lake Musiwaw Achikunipi (lake of seals in the tundra).

See also
Nastapoka River, a watercourse
List of lakes of Quebec

References

External links
fr:Lacs des Loups Marins

Lakes of Nord-du-Québec